Edward L. Stratemeyer (October 4, 1862 – May 10, 1930) was an American publisher, writer of children's fiction, and founder of the Stratemeyer Syndicate. He was one of the most prolific writers in the world, producing in excess of 1,300 books himself, selling in excess of 500 million copies. He also created many well-known fictional book series for juveniles, including The Rover Boys, The Bobbsey Twins, Tom Swift, The Hardy Boys, and Nancy Drew series, many of which sold millions of copies and remain in publication. On Stratemeyer's legacy, Fortune wrote: "As oil had its Rockefeller, literature had its Stratemeyer."

Early life
Stratemeyer was born the youngest of six children in Elizabeth, New Jersey, to Henry Julius Stratemeyer, a tobacconist, and Anna Siegel. They were both from Hanover, Germany, immigrating to the United States in 1837. Although they were German, he and his siblings were educated in English and spoke English to each other.

Growing up, Edward read the likes of Horatio Alger and William T. Adams, writers who penned beloved rags-to-riches tales of the hardworking young American. These stories greatly influenced him. As a teenager, Stratemeyer operated his own printing press in the basement of his father's tobacco shop, distributing flyers and pamphlets among his friends and family. These included stories called The Newsboy's Adventure and The Tale of a Lumberman. After he graduated from high school, he went to work in his father's store. It wasn't until the age of 26 in 1888 that Stratemeyer sold his first story, Victor Horton's Idea, to the popular children's magazine Golden Days for $76—over six times the average weekly paycheck at the time.

Career
Stratemeyer moved to Newark, New Jersey, in 1890 and opened a paper store. He ran his shop while continuing to write stories under pseudonyms. He was able to write for many genres including detective dime novels, westerns, and serials that ran in newspapers.

In 1893, Stratemeyer hired the popular dime-novel writer Gilbert Patten, according to Patten's own autobiography, Frank Merriwell's 'Father': An Autobiography by Gilbert Patten (Burt L. Standish) (U OK Press 1964). Patten writes that he did not like Stratemeyer. (A less-reliable source says that Stratemeyer was hired by Patten to write as an editor for the Street & Smith publication Good News.)

In 1894, he published his first full-length book, Richard Dare's Venture, which was the first in his Bound to Succeed series. It contained autobiographical content and was similar to Alger's rags-to-riches story formula.

In 1899, Horatio Alger wrote Stratemeyer as editor of the Good News, asking him to finish one of his manuscripts. Alger was in poor health at the time. When Alger died later the same year, Stratemeyer continued to edit and finish several of Alger's other books. That same year, after Alger died, Stratemeyer wrote and published The Rover Boys, which became a tremendously popular series in the vein of the classic dime novel. The Rover Boys was described as "The first highly successful series by Edward Stratemeyer; each volume had a preface from Edward Stratemeyer himself, thanking his readers and touting the other books. It's generally accepted that Stratemeyer wrote all of the books." He said this series was his personal favorite.

Stratemeyer formed the Stratemeyer Syndicate in 1905 and hired journalists to write stories based on his ideas. He paid them a flat rate for each book and kept the copyrights to the novels.

Personal life 
He married Magdalena Van Camp, the daughter of a Newark businessman, on March 25, 1891. The couple had two daughters: Harriet Stratemeyer Adams (1892–1982) and Edna C. Squier (1895–1974), both of whom would later take over the future Stratemeyer Syndicate.

Stratemeyer enjoyed the outdoors and often took annual summer trips to the Great Lakes, Lake George, and Lake Champlain with his family. They traveled as far as the west coast and Yosemite.  A humble man, he never sought public attention and preferred living a private and quiet life with his family at their home on N. 7th Street in the Roseville section of Newark. His relationships with his daughters was described as "warm", and his daughter Harriet recalled that it was a lively atmosphere growing up.

Stratemeyer was a member of the Roseville Athletic Club and the New Jersey Historical Association.

Stratemeyer died at age 67 in Newark, New Jersey on May 10, 1930, of lobar pneumonia and was buried in Evergreen Cemetery in Hillside, New Jersey. On May 12, 1930, two days after his death, the New York Times reported that his Rover Boys series "had sales exceeding 5,000,000 copies."

Accomplishments
He pioneered the book-packaging technique of producing a consistent, long-running series of books using a team of freelance writers. All of the books in the series used the same characters in similar situations. All of the freelance writers, including Mildred Benson, who developed the character of Nancy Drew, were published under a pen name owned by his company.

Through his Stratemeyer Syndicate, founded in 1906, Stratemeyer employed a massive number of editors, copy writers, stenographers, co-authors, and secretaries. With their help, he greatly contributed to a new genre of juvenile fiction. He was responsible for launching several series including
 (1899) The Rover Boys
 (1904) The Bobbsey Twins
 (1905) Dave Porter
 (1910) Tom Swift
 (1912) Baseball Joe
 (1927) The Hardy Boys
 (1930) Nancy Drew
 (1934) The Dana Girls

Fictional depictions
 Edward Stratemeyer appears in the television series The Young Indiana Jones Chronicles. In the series, Stratemeyer is the father of the fictional Nancy Stratemeyer (Robyn Lively), who dates Indiana Jones in high school. Indiana is shown to be a big fan of Tom Swift, and gives Stratemeyer advice for one of his stories.

See also

 List of children's literature authors
 List of people from New Jersey
 List of people from New York City
 List of publishers

References

Further reading
 Loh, Sandra Tsing (October 2005). "The Secret of the Old SawNancy Drew Has Two Mommies".  The Atlantic  Retrieved February 11, 2012. (A book review Melanie Rehak's Girl Sleuth: Nancy Drew and the Women Who Created Her.  Orlando, Florida:  Harcourt.
 Rehak, Melanie Girl Sleuth: Nancy Drew and the Women Who Created Her (2005). Orlando, Florida:  Harcourt.  .)

External links

 
 Stratemeyer.org, a fansite on the Stratemeyer Syndicate
 
 
 
  (writing as Arthur M. Winfield)
  (writing as captain Quincy Allen)
 

Place of death missing
1862 births
1930 deaths
19th-century American businesspeople
19th-century American novelists
19th-century publishers (people)
20th-century American businesspeople
20th-century American novelists
20th-century publishers (people)
American children's writers
American crime fiction writers
American publishers (people)
American people of German descent
Burials at Evergreen Cemetery (Hillside, New Jersey)
Businesspeople from New Jersey
Businesspeople from New York City
Writers from Elizabeth, New Jersey
Pulp fiction writers
Stratemeyer Syndicate
Writers from New York City
American male novelists
19th-century American male writers
Businesspeople from Elizabeth, New Jersey
Dime novelists
20th-century American male writers
Novelists from New York (state)
Novelists from New Jersey
19th-century pseudonymous writers
20th-century pseudonymous writers